Bobby Bollier (born August 22, 1989) is an American professional swimmer. Bollier is a two-time silver medalist at the World University Games. In 2015 he won a silver medal for a relay and placed 8th in the 200m fly at the Pan-American Games. He placed third in the 200 Butterfly at the 2012 US Olympic Team Trials. In 2011, he was the US National Champion in the 200m Fly. He was a 14 time CSCAA All-American and was named a First Team Academic All-American while at Stanford University. In 2015, Bollier signed with swimwear company Dolfin. Bollier received a Work the Dream Grant in 2013 from the Fran Crippen Elevation Foundation.

Bollier's mother is Barbara Bollier, a physician and former member of the Kansas Legislature. His father is Rene Bollier, a physician.

References

1989 births
Living people
American male swimmers
Pan American Games medalists in swimming
Pan American Games silver medalists for the United States
Universiade medalists in swimming
Swimmers at the 2015 Pan American Games
Universiade silver medalists for the United States
Medalists at the 2009 Summer Universiade
Medalists at the 2011 Summer Universiade
Medalists at the 2015 Pan American Games
Stanford Cardinal men's swimmers